The Guggenheim Treasure was lost on September 26, 1903. The barge Harold moved out of dock at the South Street Seaport in New York City with 7,700 silver and lead ingots, bound for American Smelting and Refining Company in Perth Amboy, New Jersey. The silver and the smelters belonged to the Guggenheim family. The barge sank off Staten Island, and was never recovered.

References

Maritime incidents in 1903
Shipwrecks of the New York (state) coast
Guggenheim family
History of Staten Island